Walter Silvestre Cubilla (born March 5, 1989 in Pergamino) is an Argentine footballer who currently plays as an attacking midfielder for Universitario Popayán.

Honours

Club
Deportes Antofagasta
Chilean Primera División B: 2011

External links
 
 
 

1989 births
Living people
Argentine footballers
Argentine expatriate footballers
Club Atlético Lanús footballers
Club Atlético Atlanta footballers
C.D. Antofagasta footballers
Deportivo Pereira footballers
La Equidad footballers
Cerro Largo F.C. players
Club Rubio Ñu footballers
ACF Gloria Bistrița players
Primera B de Chile players
Argentine Primera División players
Categoría Primera A players
Paraguayan Primera División players
Peruvian Segunda División players
Expatriate footballers in Chile
Expatriate footballers in Romania
Expatriate footballers in Colombia
Expatriate footballers in Paraguay
Expatriate footballers in Uruguay
Association football midfielders
People from Pergamino
Sportspeople from Buenos Aires Province